The Florida Football Alliance (FFA) is an American football semi-professional league based out of Boynton Beach, Florida. Founded in May 2007, the league opened its first season of operation on January 19, 2008 and remains the oldest continuous operating organization of its type in Florida. At present, the FFA comprises 14 teams for the 2018 season.  Member teams are divided into two separate conferences, Alliance and Florida. Within each of the respective conferences, there are two divisions and all teams play a 10-game regular season schedule that traditionally begins in late January of each year. At the end of the regular season, qualified teams compete in a post-season playoff schedule that begins in April. The champion of each respective conference then compete for the league championship in the final game of the year, dubbed the "Alliance Bowl".

Alliance Bowl

Member Teams

Current

Former

League administration

References

American football in Florida
American football leagues in the United States
Semi-professional American football
2007 establishments in Florida
Sports leagues established in 2007